Gervonta Davis (born November 7, 1994) is an American professional boxer. He has held multiple world championships in three weight classes, including the WBA (Regular) lightweight title since 2019; the IBF super featherweight title in 2017; the WBA (Super) super featherweight title twice between 2018 and 2021; and the WBA (Regular) super lightweight title in 2021.

As of June 2022, Davis is ranked as the tenth-best active boxer in the world, pound for pound, by the Boxing Writers Association of America. He is also ranked as the second best active lightweight by BoxRec, third by ESPN, and Fifth by the Transnational Boxing Rankings Board, and The Ring magazine. Known for his exceptional punching power, Davis' knockout-to-win percentage stands at 93%.

Early life
Born in Baltimore, Davis originally hails from the Sandtown-Winchester community in West Baltimore, which is one of the most crime-ridden areas of the city. He attended Digital Harbor High School, a local magnet school, but dropped out to focus on his career. He later earned his secondary degree through a GED program.

Amateur career
Davis has been training at Upton Boxing Center since he was five years old. Davis is trained by Calvin Ford who was the inspiration for the character Dennis "Cutty" Wise on the hit HBO television series, The Wire. Davis had a very successful amateur career, winning many national championships. He won the 2012 National Golden Gloves Championship, three straight National Silver Gloves Championships from 2006 to 2008, two National Junior Olympics gold medals, two National Police Athletic League Championships, and two Ringside World Championships, among others. Davis finished his illustrious amateur career with an impressive record of 206–15.

Professional career

Early career
Davis made his debut at the age of 18 on February 22, 2013, against Desi Williams, who had a professional record of 0 wins and 4 losses, all by stoppage. The fight took place at the D.C. Armory in Washington on the undercard of IBF junior welterweight fight between Lamont Peterson and Kendall Holt. Davis won the bout via first-round knockout (KO). By August 2014, Davis had recorded 8 wins and no losses, with all wins coming inside the distance. Davis was taken the six-round distance for the first time in October 2014 against veteran 28-year-old Germán Meraz (47–31–1, 25 KOs). Davis knocked Meraz down in rounds three and five, and went on to win a unanimous decision (UD), winning all three judges scoring the bout 60–52.

On February 20, 2015, at the CONSOL Energy Center in Pittsburgh, Pennsylvania, Davis became the first person to stop Israel Suarez (4–4–2, 1 KO), winning in devastating fashion with a first-round KO.

On May 22, 2015, at The Claridge Hotel in Atlantic City, New Jersey, Davis scored a technical knockout (TKO) against Alberto Mora (5–3, 1 KO) 1 minute 14 seconds into the fight. The normally durable Mora was stopped for the first time in his career. On September 12, 2015, at the MGM Grand Garden Arena in Las Vegas on Showtime as part of the Floyd Mayweather vs. Andre Berto undercard, Davis defeated Recky Dulay (8–1, 5 KOs) in only 94 seconds. On October 30, 2015, at The Venue at UCF in Orlando, Florida on Bounce TV, Davis defeated former featherweight world titleholder Cristobal Cruz (40–18–4, 24 KOs).

On December 18, 2015, at the Palms Casino Resort in Las Vegas on Spike TV, Davis scored a ninth-round KO over Luis Sanchez (17–4–1, 5 KOs). On April 1, 2016, at the D.C. Armory on Spike TV, Davis defeated Guillermo Avila (16–5, 13 KOs) by KO in the sixth round. On June 3, 2016, at the Seminole Hard Rock Hotel and Casino in Hollywood, Florida as part of a Premier Boxing Champions card, Davis knocked out Mario Antonio Macias (28–18, 14 KOs) with his first punch of the fight, which lasted only 41 seconds.

IBF super featherweight champion

Davis vs. Pedraza 
On November 15, 2016 ESPN announced that Davis would challenge for the IBF super featherweight title against undefeated José Pedraza (22–0, 12 KOs) on January 14, 2017, at the Barclays Center in New York on Showtime. The fight would take place as an undercard fight to the super middleweight world title unification fight between James DeGale and Badou Jack. The IBF granted Pedraza an exemption to fight Davis, as he had a mandatory fight against Liam Walsh looming. Prior to the fight being announced, Mayweather Promotions matchmakers tried to make a deal for Davis to fight titleholder Jason Sosa. Davis defeated Pedraza in a seventh-round KO to win the IBF super featherweight title. After the fight, Davis said that he had studied the early career of his promoter and mentor, Floyd Mayweather Jr., in order to stay composed. He said, "I had a lot of experience [from the amateur ranks], but I learned how to keep my composure. Floyd told me to stay calm, and I studied Floyd Mayweather [videos] when he was 'Pretty Boy.' My uppercut was my best shot, and it was landing all night. It felt really good to fight the way I did. I could take it and dish it out." Mayweather Jr. himself enthusiastically branded his protégé as the future of boxing. For the fight, Davis earned $75,000 compared to Pedraza, who earned the larger sum of $225,000, in what was his third defense. At the time of stoppage, Davis was ahead 59–55 on all three judges' scorecards.

Davis vs. Walsh 
On May 7, 2017, it was announced Davis would travel to London, England for his first title defense. The news came from Frank Warren, promoter of challenger Liam Walsh (21–0, 14 KO), who was also ranked number 1 by the IBF. The fight was scheduled to take place on May 20, 2017, and billed as 'Show me the Money'. At the official weigh in on May 19, Davis made weight on his third attempt. His first attempt, although he was naked, he weighed two ounces over. He was then given two hours to attempt to lose the extra weight, although he came back earlier thinking he had lost it. He eventually met the limit of 130 pounds on his third attempt. Davis stopped Walsh in the third-round to retain his IBF title. After two cagey rounds, which were controlled by Davis, he came out with power punches at the start of the third. Walsh's legs looked to give way and Davis pounced with accurate hooks to the head, eventually dropping Walsh. Walsh beat the count on unsteady legs. The fight resumed and Davis went on the attack again, connecting with every shot he threw, forcing referee Michael Alexander to stop the fight. The time of stoppage was 2 minutes and 11 seconds of round three. Many at ringside believed the stoppage was premature, including Walsh, "That was a bad stoppage. He's very fast and very active but it was too quick. He won fair and square but in England sometimes they stop the fight too early." Davis believed he would have caught Walsh eventually. The fight was shown live on Showtime in the U.S. averaging 228,000 viewers and peaking at 253,000 viewers.

Davis vs. Fonseca 
According to TMZ Sports in early July 2017, it was reported that Davis would feature in the co-main event of Floyd Mayweather Jr. vs. Conor McGregor on August 26, 2017, at the T-Mobile Arena in Paradise, Nevada. On July 29, The Ring magazine reported that Davis would likely defend his IBF title against former WBO champion Román Martínez, whose last fight was a KO loss to Vasyl Lomachenko in June 2016. On August 10, Ringtv reported that Davis would instead fight unbeaten prospect Francisco Fonseca (19–0–1, 13 KOs), who at the time was ranked number 7 by the IBF. According to some sources, the potential fight with Martínez was dropped due to notice and Martínez would not have had enough time to make the 130-pound limit. Prior to the fight being announced, the IBF had ordered Fonseca to fight their number 3 ranked Billy Dib (42–4, 24 KOs) in a final eliminator, as they were the two highest ranked available. At the weigh in, Fonseca came in at the 130-pound limit. Davis showed up an hour late and came in at 132 pounds, 2 pounds over the weight limit. Davis declined to weigh in after two hours, forcing the IBF to strip him of the title. The title was declared vacant, but the title would be still up for grabs if Fonseca secured victory. In what was billed as an easy fight for Davis, he won the fight via KO in round eight, with the ending being controversial. The final punch appeared to be an illegal punch to the back of the head to Fonseca and referee Russell Mora counted him out 39 seconds into the round. After the fight, Davis mocked Fonseca. Fonseca appeared hurt before the knockout blow, which Davis, who was being booed by the crowd, explained to Jim Gray of Showtime in the post fight interview, "I actually caught him with a body shot before that and he was hurt. So he took advantage of me hitting him in the back of his head and went down." With the win, Davis scored his tenth-straight KO victory. Due to Davis winning the fight, the IBF title remained vacant. For the fight, Davis earned a purse of $600,000 compared to the amount $35,000 that Fonseca received.

WBA (Super) super featherweight champion

Davis vs. Cuellar 
On November 15, 2017, Leonard Ellerbe, CEO of Mayweather Promotions announced that Davis would be making his in ring return in the first quarter of 2018 alongside stablemate Badou Jack. He also revealed that Davis would fight a high-level opponent. According to Ellerbe, Davis would remain at super featherweight and likely challenge for a world title in 2018. On January 24, 2018, Showtime announced that Davis would next appear on television on the undercard of Broner vs. Vargas on April 21 at the Barclays Center in New York. A day later, Ellerbe stated a deal was close to being reached for Davis to fight former world champion and IBF #3 Billy Dib (43–4, 24 KOs, 2 NC) in what would be an IBF eliminator. A purse bid, which was due to take place on January 25 was postponed to February 6. On February 21, it was reported by ESPN that the fight would not happen. Instead it was stated Davis' likely opponent would be former featherweight champion Jesús Cuellar (28–2, 21 KOs). On March 5, the fight was finalized for the vacant WBA (Regular) super featherweight title. Prior to the fight, Alberto Machado, the WBA (Super) champion at the same weight class, was inexplicably downgraded to 'Regular' champion, and the Davis-Cuellar fight was upgraded to be for Machado's WBA (Super) super featherweight title.

In front of 13,964 in attendance, Davis knocked out Cuellar in round three. Davis first knocked down Cuellar in round two courtesy of a left hook to the body and then put him down twice in round three to get the stoppage. Referee Benjy Esteves Jr. stopped the action at 2 minutes 45 seconds into the round. Davis landed 49% of his power shots in the fight. Both boxers earned $350,000 apiece. After the fight, Davis stated he wanted to unify with the winner of Tevin Farmer vs. Billy Dib, which would be contested for the IBF belt, the same belt Davis was stripped of. The bout opened Showtime's broadcast and averaged 460,000 viewers and peaked at 527,000 viewers.

Davis vs. Ruiz 
In November 2018, Davis announced that he would defend his WBA title in February 2019 against former three-weight world champion Abner Mares (31–3–1, 15 KOs) in Southern California. The fight was first teased by Mayweather via social media in August 2018, with no mention of a date or venue. The fight would see Mares moving up from featherweight, having lost his last fight in June 2018 against Léo Santa Cruz. When the fight was announced, there was a lot of talk of Mares being 'thrown to the wolves' and that he had no real chance against Davis. Mares hit back at critics explaining it was his decision to move up in weight and test himself. On December 14, the fight was confirmed to take place on February 9, 2019, at the Pechanga Arena in San Diego on Showtime. A week later the venue was changed to Dignity Health Sports Park, in Carson, California, formerly known as StubHub Center.

Mares and Davis ultimately did not fight on the scheduled date after Mares suffered a potential career ending injury, a detached retina, during sparring. Instead Davis faced challenger Hugo Ruiz, ranked #9 by the WBA at super featherweight. Davis knocked Ruiz out in the first round after breaking the challenger's nose.

Davis vs. Núñez 
On July 27, 2019, Davis made the second defense of his WBA (Super) super featherweight title when he beat Ricardo Núñez by second-round technical knockout in front of a crowd of 12,000 fans in his home city of Baltimore, Maryland. Davis took his time feeling out his opponent in the first round. In the second round, after receiving a couple of punches from Nunez, Davis went into attack mode and connected multiple times on Nunez, which prompted the referee to jump in and stop the fight. His win marked the first time a native of Baltimore had returned to the city to defend a world title since featherweight champion Harry Jeffra defeated Spider Armstrong in 1940.

WBA (Regular) lightweight champion

Davis vs. Gamboa 
On December 28, 2019, Davis moved up to the lightweight division for the first time, and captured the vacant WBA (Regular) lightweight title when he defeated former unified featherweight world champion Yuriorkis Gamboa by twelfth-round technical knockout. Gamboa was ranked #2 by the WBA at lightweight at the time. This was the first occasion that Davis had fought past the ninth round. He had dropped Gamboa in the second and eighth rounds, and built up a big lead on the judges' scorecards by the time that referee Jack Reiss stopped the fight in the final round, with scores of 109–98 twice and 109–97 all in favor of the eventual winner. His dominance was reflected in the final CompuBox punch stats, with Davis landing 120 of 321 punches thrown (37%), while Gamboa landed 78 of 617 thrown (13%).

Davis vs. Santa Cruz 
Making his PPV debut on October 31, 2020, on Showtime, Davis defended his lightweight title against four-division world champion Léo Santa Cruz at The Alamodome in San Antonio, Texas. The fight took place with more than 9,000 in attendance. In round 6, Davis caught Santa Cruz with a sharp left uppercut and the Mexican immediately fell to the canvas. The referee stopped the fight and Davis retained his lightweight title, while also winning Santa Cruz's WBA (Super) super featherweight title. At the time of the stoppage, Davis was leading on all three judges' scorecards by the identical margin, 48–47. Over the course of just under six rounds, Davis had been out-landed and out-thrown by his opponent despite being the more accurate boxer: he landed 84 of 227 punches thrown (37%), while Santa Cruz landed 97 of 390 thrown (25%). His knockout of Santa Cruz was selected as the winner of The Ring Magazine Knockout of The Year award for 2020.

WBA (Regular) super lightweight champion

Davis vs. Barrios 
In his second fight headlining a Showtime PPV, Davis moved up to the super lightweight division for the first time in his career to face undefeated WBA (Regular) champion Mario Barrios on June 26, 2021, at the State Farm Arena in Atlanta, Georgia. On the night, Davis prevailed in a competitive fight, knocking his opponent down twice in the eighth round, and again in the eleventh round en route to an eleventh-round technical knockout victory. Davis was leading on all three judges' scorecards, with scores of 97–91 and 96–92 twice, at the time of the stoppage. According to CompuBox punch stats, Davis landed 96 of 296 total punches (32%), while Barrios connected on 93 of 394 total punches (24%). Speaking in his post-fight interview with Jim Gray, he was satisfied with his first win in the super lightweight division: "I definitely could have made it easier but I went up two weight classes and I got the job done."

Move back down to lightweight

Davis vs. Cruz 
On October 6, 2021, Davis announced that he would be facing undefeated former WBA interim lightweight champion Rolando Romero on December 5 at the Staples Center in Los Angeles on Showtime PPV. However, Romero was pulled from the bout due to sexual assault allegations made against him, and was subsequently replaced with Isaac Cruz. On the night, Davis went the 12-round distance for the first time in his career, winning via unanimous decision, with the judges' scorecards reading 115–113, 115–113 and 116–112 in his favor. In his post-fight interview, he explained that he had fought through an injury: “I hurt my left hand in probably the sixth round. It is what it is, that’s what comes with the sport. I felt that later in the fight, he [Cruz] was breaking down, but I hurt my hand so I couldn't get him out of there." Additionally, Davis showed respect toward his opponent Cruz, saying, "A star was born tonight". When asked about the prospect of facing other top lightweights in the division, specifically undefeated champions George Kambosos Jr. and Devin Haney, as well as Ryan García, Davis did not directly answer, although he opined, "All them guys is easy work. I’m the top dog."

Davis vs. Romero 
Davis announced that he would be facing undefeated former WBA interim lightweight champion Rolando Romero on December 5 at the Staples Center in Los Angeles on Showtime PPV. However, Romero was pulled from the bout due to sexual assault allegations made against him, and was subsequently replaced with Isaac Cruz. On January 11, 2022, Romero revealed on his Instagram page that no charges against him were filed, as the claims of sexual abuse could not be substantiated. On January 24, the WBA once again ordered Davis to make a mandatory lightweight title defense against Romero, and gave the pair until February 24 to come to terms. The pair agreed to face each other on May 28, in the main event of a Showtime PPV, at the Barclays Center in New York City. He knocked out Romero in the 6th round.

Davis vs. Héctor García 
Davis' win against Romero would ultimately be his only fight in 2022, with the WBA (Regular) lightweight champion next returning to the ring to defend his title on January 7, 2023. Davis faced undefeated WBA super featherweight champion Héctor García on Showtime PPV at the Capital One Arena in Washington, D.C., in his first fight since splitting from longtime promoter Floyd Mayweather Jr. The fight was a closely-contested affair, until Davis landed a flush straight left early in the eighth round. Soon after, a fight broke out in the crowd at ringside with 2 minutes and 8 seconds left in the eighth round, causing the fight to be temporarily halted. When the action was resumed, Davis found success again with his left hand, visibly hurting García. The latter was disoriented after retreating to his stool in his corner, complaining about his eyesight. The fight was stopped, with Davis winning via eighth-round corner retirement.

Davis vs. Ryan Garcia 

On February 24, 2023, it was announced that Davis would face Ryan Garcia on April 22, in Las Vegas, Nevada. The long awaited bout would be a joint PPV event between Showtime and DAZN.

Legal issues 
On September 19, 2017, an arrest warrant was issued for Davis, who was being accused of first-degree aggravated assault. According to Maryland court records, the alleged incident took place on August 1, 2017, but did not indicate who was involved or what happened. An amount of $100,000 unsecured bond was posted for Davis' release. Davis was due to appear in court on October 19. The charge was later changed to misdemeanor second-degree assault, which carries a maximum potential sentence of 10 years or a fine of $2,500 or both. At the court, Anthony Wheeler, a childhood friend, complained that Davis punched him on the side of the head with a "gloved fist". He then stated he was diagnosed with a concussion at the hospital. The incident took place at the Upton Boxing Center in West Baltimore. It was said that Davis would stand trial on November 29, 2017. In court, the charges were dropped by Wheeler. The Baltimore Sun stated that Davis and Wheeler both embraced and walked out of the courtroom together.

On September 14, 2018, Davis was arrested in Washington, D.C. According to a police report, he and another man started a fist fight. Punches were being landed around the upper body. It was said that someone had tried to break up the fight and both men tried to flee before the police arrived.

On February 1, 2020, Davis was arrested on charges of simple battery/domestic violence against his former girlfriend. The incident occurred at the Watsco Center at the University of Miami during a basketball game where he was seen grabbing the woman's shirt "with his right hand close to her throat" and dragged her to a separate room.

On March 22, 2021, he was indicted on fourteen counts for allegedly running a red light after a November 2020 birthday party in downtown Baltimore. His Lamborghini SUV struck another car and left it smoking, sending its four occupants to the hospital including a pregnant woman. He allegedly left the scene in a Camaro that pulled up minutes later. On February 16, Davis accepted a plea deal that saw him plead guilty to leaving the scene of an accident involving bodily injury, failing to notify an owner of property damage, driving on a suspended license and running a red light. He is due to be sentenced on May 5.

On August 21, 2021, Davis was on board a Gulfstream 4 that suffered a nosewheel collapse and subsequently skidded off the runway at Fort Lauderdale Executive Airport. He and the thirteen others on board sustained no injuries.

On December 27, 2022, days before he was due to fight Héctor García, Davis was arrested and jailed in Florida on a charge of battery domestic violence. In the audio from 911 calls, the woman was heard begging police for help and saying "he's going to kill me." Police observed an abrasion on the inside of the woman's lip, with Davis accused of striking her with a "closed hand type slap." The woman eventually walked back her accusations, and the Hector Garcia bout pushed through.

Professional boxing record

Pay-per-view bouts

See also 
 List of boxing triple champions
 List of world super-featherweight boxing champions
 List of world lightweight boxing champions
List of world light-welterweight boxing champions
 List of WBA world champions
 List of IBF world champions

References

External links
 
Gervonta Davis profile at Premier Boxing Champions
Gervonta Davis – Profile, News Archive & Current Rankings at Box.Live

1994 births
Living people
Boxers from Baltimore
National Golden Gloves champions
Featherweight boxers
Southpaw boxers
American male boxers
African-American boxers
World super-featherweight boxing champions
World lightweight boxing champions
International Boxing Federation champions
World Boxing Association champions
World light-welterweight boxing champions